The Gate is a 2011 studio album by Kurt Elling, produced by Don Was. on November 30, 2011, the album received a Nomination in 54th Grammy Awards for Best Jazz Vocal Album.

Reception

The Allmusic review by Thom Jurek awarded the album four stars, and described Elling as a "modern jazz visionary". Jurek said "The Gate presents Elling at the top of his game; it is a song cycle that is mesmerizing and mysterious as it is provocative and compelling."

Track listing
 "Matte Kudasai" (Adrian Belew, Bill Bruford, Robert Fripp, Tony Levin) - 4:19
 "Steppin' Out" (Joe Jackson) - 4:48
 "Come Running to Me" (Herbie Hancock, Allee Willis) - 6:06
 "Norwegian Wood (This Bird Has Flown)" (Lennon and McCartney) - 5:39
 "Blue in Green" (Miles Davis, Al Jarreau, Frank Martin) - 6:48
 "Samurai Cowboy" (Marc Johnson, Kurt Elling) - 3:24
 "After the Love Has Gone" (Bill Champlin, David Foster, Jay Graydon) - 5:51
 "Golden Lady" (Stevie Wonder) - 5:47
 "Nighttown, Lady Bright" (Don Grolnick, Elling) - 9:00

Personnel
Performance
Kurt Elling - vocals
Laurence Hobgood - piano, arrangements
John McLean - guitar
John Patitucci - double bass
Terreon Gully - drums, percussion (exc. 2, 5, 7)
Kobie Watkins - drums (2, 5, 7)
Lenny Castro - percussion (2, 3, 5, 6)
Bob Mintzer - tenor saxophone (6, 7, 8)

Production
Don Was - producer
Kurt Elling, Laurence Hobgood - co-producers
Chris Dunn - executive producer
Bob Belden - arranger?
Chris Allen - engineer
Ted Tuthill - assistant engineer
Seth Presant - mixing engineer
Paul Blakemore - mastering
Mary Hogan - A&R
Rachel E. Sullivan - package design
Chris Faust - cover photo
Steve Schapiro - back cover photo, inside photo

References

Concord Records albums
Albums produced by Don Was
Kurt Elling albums
2011 albums